Three common palmar digital arteries arise from the convexity of the superficial palmar arch and proceed distally on the second, third, and fourth lumbricales muscles.

Alternative names for these arteries are:  common volar digital arteries, ulnar metacarpal arteries, arteriae digitales palmares communes, or aa. digitales volares communes.

Each of these arteries receive the corresponding volar metacarpal artery and then divide into a pair of proper palmar digital arteries (q.v.).

Additional images

Footnotes and references

External links
  - "Palm of the hand, superficial dissection, anterior view"

Arteries of the upper limb